Phaleria clerodendron, commonly known as scented daphne, scented phaleria or rosy apple, is an evergreen tree or tall shrub in the family Thymelaeaceae. It is endemic to the rainforests of north-eastern Queensland, Australia.

Description
It is often multi-stemmed and may be buttressed.

Flowering occurs from October to April and the inflorescences mostly arise from the branches (ramiflorous), or from the trunk (cauliflorous), but may also arise in the leaf axils. They are followed by globose, fleshy, red fruits which are a drupe, and they ripen between December and July.

Taxonomy
Ferdinand von Mueller initially described the species in 1869 as Drimyspermum clerodendron in his work Fragmenta Phytographiae Australiae (vol.7), from material collected by John Dallachy at Rockingham Bay. In 1873 George Bentham published another description in Flora Australiensis (vol.6), in which it was given the current binomial combination.

Etymology
The genus name Phaleria comes from the Ancient Greek φάλαρος (phálāros) meaning "having a white spot"; the species epithet clerodendron refers to a resemblance to the genus Clerodendrum.

Distribution and habitat
P. clerodendron is endemic to north-eastern Queensland, with recorded occurrences from near Cooktown in the north to Cardwell in the south.

Ecology
Fruits of the scented daphne are eaten by cassowaries.

Conservation
This species is listed by the Queensland Department of Environment and Science as least concern. , it has not been assessed by the IUCN.

Cultivation
The species is regarded as an attractive garden ornamental due to its dark green foliage, the spectacular and pleasantly-scented flower clusters, and the colourful fruit. It may be grown with the correct care as far south as Sydney.

Gallery

References

External links

View a map of recorded sightings of Phaleria clerodendron at the Australasian Virtual Herbarium
See images of Phaleria clerodendron on Flickriver

clerodendron
Malvales of Australia
Flora of Queensland
Taxa named by Ferdinand von Mueller
Plants described in 1869
Endemic flora of Australia